Un amore a Roma (internationally released as Love in Rome) is a 1960 Italian romantic drama film directed by Dino Risi.

Plot
Marcello (Baldwin), a young writer, loves Anna (Demongeot), a femme fatale-ish beauty who can't remain faithful to any man for very long. Anna has her sights set on a movie career. However, she only seems to be able to secure parts in low-brow peplum films.

Marcello is frustrated by Anna's capricious nature, while he himself is involved with two other women, Fulvia (Martinelli) and Eleonora (Perschy). At one point, Marcello even proposes to Eleonora but is unable to follow it through.

Cast 
 Mylène Demongeot: Anna Padoan
 Peter Baldwin: Marcello Cenni
 Elsa Martinelli: Fulvia
 Claudio Gora: Eng. Curtatoni
 Maria Perschy: Eleonora Curtatoni
 Jacques Sernas: Tony Meneghini
 Armando Romeo: Nello D'Amore
 Umberto Orsini: Peppino Barlacchi
 Fanfulla: Moreno
 Vittorio De Sica: the director
 Enrico Glori

References

External links

1960 films
Films directed by Dino Risi
Commedia all'italiana
1960 comedy films
Films scored by Carlo Rustichelli
1960s Italian-language films
1960s Italian films